Beth Am is a Conservative synagogue in Baltimore, Maryland. The congregation is located in Baltimore's Reservoir Hill community, and is considered to be one of the city's historic synagogues. It is one of two non-Orthodox synagogues in Baltimore's inner city. Beth Am is an urban, egalitarian congregation affiliated with the United Synagogue of Conservative Judaism, and it is known for balancing traditional prayer and learning with innovative and intellectual critique.

History
The building currently known as "Beth Am" was first founded as Chizuk Amuno Congregation, which has since moved to a new suburban location in Pikesville, Maryland. Chizuk Amuno first occupied the building in 1922 and moved to Pikesville in 1958.

Following the move of Chizuk Amuno, services continued in the building, led by Cantor Abba Weisgall. Then, in 1974, the current Beth Am congregation was founded as Dr. Louis L. Kaplan's shul. Kaplan's wife Etta suggested the name, which translates to "House of the People".

Leadership
Kaplan served informally as the congregation's spiritual leader until 1981, when the congregation hired its first full-time rabbi.

The congregation had no full-time rabbi in the years 2000–2002, when they were served part-time by Rabbi Sheila Russian, who in 1979 had become the first female rabbi in Baltimore.

The current rabbi is Rabbi Daniel Cotzin Burg, who joined the congregation in 2010. The Rabbi Emeritus is Jon Konheim, who has been with the congregation since 2002.

Principles
Beth Am strives to be, in Isaiah's words, “a house of prayer for all peoples”. Beth Am is known for its warmth, its open embrace of children, and its pluralism.

References

Notes

Sources

External links
Homepage

Conservative synagogues in Maryland
Reservoir Hill, Baltimore
Synagogues in Baltimore